Oliva neostina is a species of sea snail in the olive family, Olividae.

Distribution
This marine species occurs from the Bay of Bengal to Fiji|.

References

 Vervaet F.L.J. (2018). The living Olividae species as described by Pierre-Louis Duclos. Vita Malacologica. 17: 1–111.

neostina